King: A Filmed Record... Montgomery to Memphis is a 1970 American documentary film biography of Martin Luther King Jr. and his creation and leadership of the nonviolent campaign for civil rights and social and economic justice in the Civil Rights Movement.

Summary
It uses only original newsreel and other primary material, unvarnished and unretouched, and covers the period from the Montgomery bus boycott of 1955 and 1956 through his assassination in 1968. The original newsreel segments are framed by celebrity narrators Harry Belafonte, Ruby Dee, Ben Gazzara, Charlton Heston, James Earl Jones, Burt Lancaster, Paul Newman, Anthony Quinn, Clarence Williams III, and Joanne Woodward. The movie was produced by Ely Landau and directed by Sidney Lumet (the only documentary he directed) and Joseph L. Mankiewicz. Richard J. Kaplan was the associate producer in charge of production.

Released
When first released, it was shown in theaters as a "one-time-only" event on March 24, 1970 for one night only.

Reception and legacy
The film has received 100% on Rotten Tomatoes.

It was nominated for the Academy Award for Best Documentary, Features.
In 1999, this film was deemed "culturally, historically, or aesthetically significant" by the United States Library of Congress and selected for preservation in its National Film Registry.

Rediscovery
After its "one-time-only" showing it was occasionally seen on commercial television (unedited and with limited interruption) and for a short period released for home video on the Pacific Arts label and distributed to the educational market by Richard Kaplan Productions.  Then for many years it was no longer available and rarely seen.  Finally, in 2010 Richard Kaplan, who had long felt that King should be seen by a new generation who knew of it only by reputation, set up a not-for-profit company, A Filmed Record Inc., and produced a DVD using master elements he had stored over the years.   A Filmed Record, Inc. released the DVD and King was once again available after 40 years of being a "lost" film.

In 2012 A Filmed Record, Inc. (with the cooperation of the estate of Ely Landau producer of the original film) entered into an agreement with Kino Lorber giving them worldwide exclusive rights to distribute King and to make possible its being seen by the largest possible audience.  Kino Lorber, Inc., in partnership with The Library of Congress and with the cooperation of the Museum of Modern Art, restored and remastered the original enabling 35 mm prints and made the film available on DVD and Blu-ray.  Kino Lorber and Kaplan prepared a nationwide commemoration of the 50th Anniversary of the March on Washington and King's  "I Have a Dream" speech, which was screened at the Brooklyn Academy of Music's BAMcinématek on August 13, 2013, followed by a screening at Film Forum on August 28, 2013.  Kino Lorber is also launching an educational outreach campaign to provide a 24-minute abridged version of the film, titled Legacy of a Dream, to every high school in America.

See also

 Civil rights movement in popular culture
 List of American films of 1970
 Malcolm X, 1972 documentary also nominated for Best Documentary Feature Oscar

References

External links 

Alive Mind Cinema
A Filmed Record, Inc. webpage
Legacy of a Dream

King: A Filmed Record... Montgomery to Memphis essay by Daniel Eagan in America's Film Legacy: The Authoritative Guide to the Landmark Movies in the National Film Registry, Bloomsbury Academic, 2010 , pages 663-665 
Excerpt on Kino Lorber's official YouTube channel

1970 films
1970s English-language films
American documentary films
Documentary films about the civil rights movement
United States National Film Registry films
1970 documentary films
Films about Martin Luther King Jr.
Black-and-white documentary films
American black-and-white films
1970s American films
Collage film